Philip Brian Scott (born August 4, 1958) is an American politician, businessman, and stock car racer who has served as the 82nd governor of Vermont since 2017. A member of the Republican Party, he was elected governor in the 2016 general election with 53% of the vote. He was reelected in 2018 with 55.2% of the vote; in 2020 with 68.5%; and in 2022 with 69.2% of the vote and a margin of 46%, the largest of any Vermont gubernatorial election since 1996, and the largest for a Republican since 1950. Scott was the 81st lieutenant governor of Vermont from 2011 to 2017 and a state senator representing the Washington County district from 2001 to 2011.

Regarded as one of the nation's most popular governors, Scott is considered a moderate and is the only Republican elected to a statewide office in Vermont as of 2023.

Early life 
Philip B. Scott was born on August 4, 1958, in Barre, Vermont, the son of Marian (Beckley) and Howard Roy Scott (1914–1969). His father was disabled after being wounded while serving in World War II and later worked as vehicle permit supervisor for the state highway department. In 1973, Scott's mother married Robert F. Dubois (1919–1983).

Scott graduated from Barre's Spaulding High School in 1976, and is a 1980 graduate of the University of Vermont, where he received a Bachelor of Science degree in industrial education.

Business career 
After graduating from high school, Scott began working at DuBois Construction, a Middlesex business founded by the brother of his mother's second husband. Scott became a co-owner in 1986. He is a past president of the Associated General Contractors of Vermont. On January 6, 2012, a fire at DuBois Construction caused substantial damage, but the owners rebuilt and continued operations.

After being elected governor, Scott sold his share of the company to avoid possible conflicts of interest, since DuBois Construction does business with the State of Vermont. He sold his 50% share for $2.5 million plus 3% interest, payable over 15 years. Scott indicated that he opted to finance the sale himself rather than having the company borrow the money to pay him in full in order to preserve the company's bonding capacity. Critics suggested that Scott's sale of his share in the company did not eliminate possible conflicts of interest, but Scott and the attorney who negotiated the sale on his behalf disagreed.

In October 2018, the state ethics commission issued an advisory opinion indicating that Scott did have a conflict of interest because of his continued connection to the company. In September 2019, the commission withdrew the opinion, with its executive director indicating that the process for receiving the complaint, investigating, and issuing the advisory opinion had been flawed. In February 2022, DuBois executives indicated they had reached an agreement to sell the company to Barrett Trucking of Burlington. Terms of the sale were not disclosed, including whether Scott would receive a lump sum or continue receiving installment payments, but DuBois representatives indicated that the company's obligation to Scott would be satisfied.

Political career

Vermont Senate 
A Republican, Scott was elected to the Vermont Senate in 2000, one of three at-large senators representing the Washington County Senate district. He was reelected four times, and served from 2001 to 2011. During his Senate career, he was vice chair of the Transportation Committee and chaired the Institutions Committee. He also served as a member of the Natural Resources and Energy Committee. As chair of the Institutions Committee, Scott redesigned the Statehouse cafeteria to increase efficiency.

During his time in the Senate, Scott served on several special committees, including the Judicial Nominating Board, the Legislative Advisory Committee on the State House, the Joint Oversight Corrections Committee, and the Legislative Council Committee.

Lieutenant governor 

On November 2, 2010, Scott was elected the 81st lieutenant governor of Vermont, defeating Steve Howard. He took office on January 6, 2011. He was reelected in 2012, defeating Cassandra Gekas, and in 2014, defeating Dean Corren.

As lieutenant governor, Scott presided over the Vermont Senate when it was in session. In addition, he served as a member of the committee on committees, the three-member panel that determines Senate committee assignments and appoints committee chairs and vice chairs. In the event of a tie vote, Scott was tasked with casting a tie-breaking vote. He also served as acting governor when the governor was out of state.

As a state senator and lieutenant governor, Scott was active with a number of community service projects. In 2005, he founded the Wheels for Warmth program, which buys used car tires and resells safe ones, with the profits going to heating fuel assistance programs in Vermont.

Job approval as Lieutenant Governor 
In September 2015, Scott maintained high name recognition and favorability among Vermont residents. The Castleton University Polling Institute found that more than three-quarters of Vermonters knew who he was, and that of those who were able to identify him, 70% viewed him favorably. Despite his being a Republican, the same poll found that 59% of self-identified Democrats held a favorable view of Scott, while only 15% held an unfavorable view of him.

National Lieutenant Governors Association 
Scott was an active member of the National Lieutenant Governors Association (NLGA), and served on the NLGA Executive Committee and the NLGA Finance Committee. As a member of the NLGA, he joined fellow lieutenant governors across the country in two bipartisan letters opposing proposed cuts to the Army National Guard in 2014 and 2015. Scott was a lead sponsor of an NLGA resolution to develop a long-term vision for surface transportation in the U.S. He also co-sponsored resolutions to recognize the importance of arts and culture in tourism to the U.S. economy, to support Science, Technology, Engineering, and Mathematics (STEM) education, to support designating a National Arts in Education Week, and to support a comprehensive system to end homelessness among U.S. veterans.

Governor of Vermont

2016 campaign for governor 
In September 2015, Scott announced his candidacy for Vermont governor.

An early 2016 poll commissioned by Vermont Public Radio and conducted by the Castleton University Polling Institute found that of the two candidates for the Republican nomination for governor, Scott was preferred by 42% of respondents compared to4% for Bruce Lisman. A poll commissioned by Energy Independent Vermont in late June 2016 indicated that Scott had the support of 68% of Republicans to Lisman's 23%.

On May 8, 2016, Scott was endorsed by nearly all of Vermont's Republican legislators. He did not support Donald Trump in the 2016 presidential campaign.

On August 9, Scott defeated Lisman in the primary election by 21 percentage points. He defeated Sue Minter, the Democratic nominee, in the November general election by 8.7 percentage points.

Governorship

Fraud case settlement 
On April 13, 2017, Scott announced a $150 million settlement in the ongoing case of alleged fraud relating to the Jay Peak and Burke Mountain EB-5 developments.

Job approval 
According to an October 2017 Morning Consult poll, Scott's approval rating stood at 60%, making him the 7th most popular governor in the country. The poll was conducted between July 1 and September 30, 2017, and had a margin of error of 4%. In April 2018, another Morning Consult poll found that Scott's approval rating had risen to 65%, making him the 4th most popular governor in the country. His favorability ratings fell to 52% by May 2018, and to 47% by July, marking the largest decrease in popularity for any governor in the nation. By April 2019, Scott's approval rating had recovered to 59%, with a 28% disapproval rating, making him the 5th most popular governor in the country, with a net approval of 31%.

Political positions 
Scott is a liberal Republican. As a candidate and governor, he is known to "embrace moderate and sometimes even liberal policies"; his views can be described as "fiscally conservative but socially liberal". Of his views, Scott has said: "I am very much a fiscal conservative. But not unlike most Republicans in the Northeast, I'm probably more on the left of center from a social standpoint... I am a pro-choice Republican." Scott supported the impeachment inquiry into Donald Trump that began in September 2019. In the 2020 U.S. presidential election, Scott announced that he had voted for Democratic nominee Joe Biden. After the 2021 storming of the U.S. Capitol building, he called for Trump to "resign or be removed from office".

Fiscal and budgetary issues 
Scott pledged to veto any budget that grows faster than the growth rate of the underlying economy or wages in the previous year, or that increases statewide property taxes. Conflicts over raising property tax rates, which the state legislature supported and Scott opposed, led to a strained relationship between him and the legislature in 2018 for the FY19 budget, despite high revenues overall.

Scott has made addressing Vermont's long-term unfunded liabilities a priority, and has worked with State Treasurer Beth Pearce to pay down Vermont's pension debt.

Taxes and fees 
The FY18 budget Scott signed into law did not include any new or increased taxes or fees. He has said that he opposes any new taxes. He also refused to sign a bill that would have raised property taxes. Scott vetoed the FY19 budget twice before allowing it to go into law without his signature, as the threat of a government shutdown approached.

In early 2018, Scott called for eliminating the tax on Social Security benefits. House legislators incorporated a modified form of this proposal into the final FY19 budget, eliminating the tax for low- and middle-income retirees. The tax reform Scott planned (which was ultimately implemented) also lowered state income tax rates by 0.2% for all brackets; tied Vermont's tax system to Adjusted Gross Income (AGI); created Vermont-defined income deductions and personal exemptions similar to the federal tax code; increased the state earned income tax credit by three percentage points; and added a new 5% charitable contribution tax credit. Scott's administration has reduced both Workers' Compensation and Unemployment Insurance tax rates. He has twice proposed to phase out the tax on military retirement income, which the legislature did not advance.

Economic development 
Scott has set a goal to boost the state's economy by increasing the state's population to 700,000 in 10 years by encouraging young people who come to study in the state to remain after graduation. University of Vermont economics professor Arthur Woolf Scott suggested that retention of older Vermonters, with larger incomes and tax revenues, would be a better focus, but Scott pointed to the lower average healthcare costs associated with a younger population.

Scott's economic development plan has largely focused on workforce development and economic incentives. He has advocated and achieved increasing tax credits for development, new support for small business, additional initiatives for rural economic growth, tax increment financing, permitting reform, and tax exemptions in key industries. Scott has made expanding the labor force a priority of his administration, and has proposed and achieved initiatives that invest in workforce recruitment, retention, and relocation.

Health care 
Scott signed a bill requiring Vermonters to have health insurance, making Vermont among a few states to implement such a policy after the federal repeal of the individual mandate provision of the Affordable Care Act. But in part due to his opposition to a financial penalty for an individual mandate, the legislature passed and Scott signed a bill that would simply require attestation of health insurance.

Scott has advocated moving away from a fee-for-service-based health care system, and has suggested focusing more on the quality of care and services rendered. This model has been implemented on a pilot basis with an accountable care organization.

In April 2021, Scott was criticized for implementing a race-based COVID-19 vaccination schedule. In response, he released a statement condemning what he called a "racist response" to the plan.

Education 
Scott has called for modifying Act 46 to improve cost containment measures, incorporate property tax reduction, preserve local control and school choice, and allow communities to keep the funds they save through school district mergers. He has expressed support for flexible learning plans and new technologies to improve educational outcomes.

Scott's FY18 budget made investments in education, including a $3 million increase in the base appropriation to the Vermont State Colleges to stabilize tuition and a new position in the Agency of Education focused on career and technical education. The budget also expanded a base appropriation for child care financial assistance by $2.5 million. The FY20 budget Scott signed into law built on these investments, with an additional $7.4 million for child care and $3 million more for higher education. The next year, Scott worked with the legislature to eliminate tuition for members of the Vermont National Guard.

As a state senator, Scott voted for legislation to reduce education property tax rates. Scott's FY18 budget froze property tax rates, and the FY19 budget froze residential property tax rates.

Gun law 
Scott passed legislation that banned bump stock devices, expanded background checks for gun purchases, raised the age to purchase firearms to 21 (with certain exemptions), limited the purchase of certain high-capacity magazines, strengthened laws to keep guns out of the hands of alleged domestic abusers, and created risk protection orders. He created a Violence Prevention Task Force, ordered a security assessment of all Vermont schools, and signed legislation appropriating $5 million for school security grants.

Government reform and modernization 
Scott supports limiting Vermont's annual legislative session to 90 days. According to him, the session's unpredictable length discourages everyday Vermonters from running for office. A 90-day session, according to Scott, would encourage more people to run for elected office by setting clear parameters. Furthermore, he argues that a 90-day session would force the legislature to focus on key fiscal and operational issues.

As governor, Scott created a Government Modernization and Efficiency Team to implement efficiency audits, strengthen IT planning, implement a digital government strategy, and identify opportunities to eliminate inefficiencies, establish clear metrics and streamline services. He also created the Program to Improve Vermont Outcomes Together (PIVOT) initiative, which asks frontline state employees for ways to make state government systems more efficient and easier to use. Scott consolidated IT functions in state government with the creation of the Agency of Digital Services, saving $2.19 million. He also merged the Department of Liquor Control and the Lottery Department into the Department of Liquor and Lottery to achieve savings. Scott's administration has worked to achieve internal improvements through lean training and permit process improvements. He also successfully sought to eliminate and merge redundant boards, commissions, studies and reports.

Transportation 
In July 2016, Scott outlined the transportation priorities he would implement as governor. He said he would strengthen the link between economic growth and Vermont's infrastructure; oppose additional transportation taxes, including a carbon tax; oppose accumulating additional state debt for transportation; encourage innovation in transportation by implementing a Research and Development (R&D) tax credit and an Angel Investor tax credit (a 60% credit toward cash equity investments in Vermont businesses, specifically targeted toward transportation, energy and manufacturing firms); protect the state's transportation fund to ensure it is used for transportation purposes only; advocate federal reforms and flexibility in transportation policy; and update the Agency of Transportation's long-range plan for transportation.

Abortion 

Scott is pro-choice. In June 2019, he signed into law an abortion rights bill.

Civil rights 

Scott supports same-sex marriage. He signed into a law a gender-neutral bathroom bill intended to recognize the rights of transgender people. Of the new law, he said, "Vermont has a well-earned reputation for embracing equality and being inclusive". Scott also signed gun control legislation that "limits some aspects of gun possession and empowers authorities to remove guns from people who may be dangerous".

Drugs 

On May 24, 2017, Scott vetoed a bill that would have legalized marijuana recreationally in Vermont. In October 2020, he announced he would not veto another bill to legalize recreational marijuana use, allowing the bill to become a law without his signature.

As governor, Scott created an Opioid Coordination Council, appointed a director of drug policy and prevention, and convened a statewide summit on growing the workforce to support opioid and substance abuse treatment. To further treatment options, he worked with the Secretary of State's Office of Professional Regulation to streamline the licensing process for treatment professionals. Scott boosted efforts to reduce the drug supply through the Vermont Drug Task Force, Drug Take Back days, and expanding prescription drug disposal sites.

Immigration
Scott opposed the Trump administration's immigration policies. In 2017, he signed a bill to limit the involvement of Vermont police with the federal government in regard to immigration, and the Department of Justice notified Vermont that it had been preliminarily found to be a sanctuary jurisdiction on November 15, 2017. Scott opposed the Trump administration's "zero tolerance" policy and the separation of families at the border.

Environmental issues 
Scott approved $48 million for clean water funding in 2017. He signed an executive order creating the Vermont Climate Action Commission. Scott announced a settlement with Saint-Gobain to address water quality issues and PFOA contamination in Bennington County. His FY18 budget proposal called for a tax holiday on energy efficient products and vehicles. On June 2, 2017, Scott led Vermont to join the United States Climate Alliance, after President Trump withdrew the U.S. from the Paris Agreement. Scott committed to achieving 90% renewable energy by 2050. In 2019, he signed several pieces of legislation related to water quality, including creating a long-term funding mechanism for cleaning up the state's waterways, testing for lead in schools and child care centers, and regulating perfluorooctanoic acid and related PFAS chemicals in drinking water. On September 15, 2020, Scott vetoed the Global Warming Solutions Act, which mandated reductions to Vermont's carbon emissions. Ten days later, his veto was overridden.

Racing career 
Scott is a champion stock car racer. He won the 1996 and 1998 Thunder Road Late Model Series (LMS) championships and the 1997 and 1999 Thunder Road Milk Bowls. (The Milk Bowl is Thunder Road's annual season finale.)

In 2002, he became a three-time champion, winning both the Thunder Road and Airborne Late Model Series track championships and the American Canadian Tour championship. (Airborne Park Speedway is a stock car track in the town of Plattsburgh, New York). He also competed in the 2005 British Stock Car Association (BriSCA) Formula One Championship of the World, but did not finish.

On July 6, 2017, Scott won the Thunder Road Late Model Series feature race; he started from the pole, and the victory was his first since 2013. Scott participated in a limited number of Thunder Road events in 2019, and won the June 27, 2019, LMS feature race. In July 2022, Scott competed in the Governor's Cup 150, in which he finished 23rd. As of July 2019, Scott has 31 career wins, which places him third all time in Thunder Road's LMS division.

Personal life 
Scott lives in Berlin, Vermont, with his wife, Diana McTeague Scott, and their two dogs. He has two adult daughters.

Electoral history

2022

2020

2018

2016

2014

2012

2010

2008

2006

2004

2002

2000

Notes

References

External links 

Governor Phil Scott official government website
Phil Scott for Governor official campaign website

Profile at the Vermont General Assembly (archived)

|-

|-

|-

|-

|-

|-

1958 births
20th-century American businesspeople
21st-century American businesspeople
21st-century American politicians
American construction businesspeople
Businesspeople from Vermont
Republican Party governors of Vermont
Lieutenant Governors of Vermont
Living people
People from Barre, Vermont
People from Berlin, Vermont
Racing drivers from Vermont
University of Vermont alumni
Republican Party Vermont state senators